Gaspard du Bois, Latinized Nemius (1587–1667) was the sixth bishop of Antwerp and the ninth archbishop of Cambrai.

Life
Nemius was born in 's-Hertogenbosch on 23 April 1587. He studied at the University of Douai, graduating Doctor of Sacred Theology, and went on to lecture in Theology there. On 23 May 1634 he was appointed bishop of Antwerp, and he was consecrated in Antwerp Cathedral on 22 July 1635. On 10 October 1642 he founded a confraternity of the Blessed Trinity in St. James' Church, Antwerp, to support the work of the Trinitarian Order in redeeming Christian captives.

On 24 August 1649 he was elected archbishop of Cambrai. The election received papal confirmation in 1651, and he was installed 19 March 1652. He died in Cambrai on 22 November 1667 and was buried in the choir of the cathedral.

References

1587 births
1667 deaths
17th-century Roman Catholic bishops in the Holy Roman Empire
Bishops of Antwerp
Archbishops of Cambrai
University of Douai alumni